Far right bands first appeared in the late 1970s.  Punk rock, and genres influenced by it, had used Nazi imagery for shock value, but those bands were usually not fascist.  This changed when Oi!, a genre of punk rock, became popular with white power skinheads.  The ambiguity of Nazi chic can make it difficult to identify a band's intentions, especially when the bands do not express a clear political message.  Academics usually identify these bands as neo-Nazi by analyzing their worldview.  Neo-Nazi bands may break with white power music in that they maintain hardline Nazi beliefs.  In countries that were persecuted by the Nazis, bands may criticize Nazi war crimes while adopting a somewhat modified worldview.

Endstufe
Honor
Kolovrat
Landser
No Remorse
Prussian Blue
RaHoWa
Skrewdriver
Skullhead
Stahlgewitter

National Socialist black metal artists

See also 
 Rock Against Communism

References

Lists of musicians